Bidholi is a small village of Vikasnagar tehsil, Dehradun district in the Indian state of Uttarakhand. It is located around 21 km from Dehradun ISBT and 11  Km from Premnagar. It falls under Sahaspur constituency of Uttarakhand Legislative Assembly . 

One of the campus of University of Petroleum & Energy Studies i.e. Energy Acres is situated in Bidholi. The village is also the home to ancient temple called Dudha Devi Temple. The village also has a Branch Office of Postal Service, Primary School, Panchayat Bhawan. Due to the rising number of Students of University of Petroleum & Energy Studies, there has been rise in the economy of the village and various commercial establishment has been established in the village.

Villages in Dehradun district